Your Friends & Neighbors is a 1998 black comedy film written and directed by Neil LaBute and starring Amy Brenneman, Aaron Eckhart, Catherine Keener, Nastassja Kinski, Jason Patric and Ben Stiller in an ensemble cast. The film was the first to be reviewed on the website Rotten Tomatoes. The film's credit sequences feature music by Apocalyptica. It was a box office flop, with its total earnings below the filming budget.

Plot
Set in an unnamed American city, two urban, middle-class couples deal with their unhappy relationships by shamelessly lying and cheating in their quest for happiness. Jerry is a theater instructor married to Terri, a writer who is alienated and physically unsatisfied by their relationship. Jerry and Terri have dinner with Mary, a writer friend of Terri's, and Mary's husband Barry, a business executive oblivious to his wife's unhappiness. During dinner, Mary talks about writing for a local newspaper column about bickering couples and their troubles, while Barry does not think that other couples' problems are anyone else's concern. After dinner, Jerry discreetly asks Mary out on a date. Mary, out of frustration, accepts.

The next day, Terri, visiting a local art gallery, meets and begins a secret romance with Cheri, a lesbian art gallery worker. Terri feels sexually satisfied with Cheri and enjoys the quiet compared with Jerry's performance.

Meanwhile, Cary, a doctor friend of Barry's, is a devious and narcissistic sexual predator who picks up and seduces naïve and emotionally vulnerable young women and quickly dumps them for his sadistic pleasure of watching them cry. Aware of the distance between Barry and Mary, Cary tries to persuade Barry to leave his wife for the swinging, non-monogamous lifestyle Cary has built for himself. Barry thinks he can save his marriage.

During Jerry and Mary's rendezvous at a local hotel, Jerry fails to get aroused during foreplay. As a result, he takes out his frustrations on Mary, believing she has made him impotent. Angry and offended by Jerry's misogynist outburst, Mary abruptly ends their "affair." A few days later, she feels more miserable when Barry unwittingly takes her to the same hotel room to rekindle their romance. Mary realizes that Jerry had told Barry about being in the room. Barry fails to understand Mary's unhappy attitude and thinks he might somehow be responsible.

Jerry, Barry, and Cary get together to work out at the local gym, and, in the steam room, Barry tries to get them to reveal their best sexual experiences. Barry tells them that he only feels satisfied with himself. Cary then tells a disturbing story about his best sexual experience: partaking in a gang rape where he and a group of friends forcibly sodomized a male high school classmate on the floor in the locker room at his boarding school when he was a teenager. Barry and Jerry are stunned but fascinated by Cary's sordid and evil story. When Barry tries to persuade Jerry to reveal his best sexual experience, Jerry refuses. After being goaded in the locker room, Jerry angrily responds that his best sexual experience was with Barry's wife. He then leaves, with Barry too stunned to reply. Cary, also caught off-guard, says: "that beats my story."

After returning home from the gym, Barry confronts Mary over dinner about her affair with Jerry, just as Terri accidentally finds out about Jerry's indiscretion after finding Mary's phone number in one of Jerry's playbooks. Mary and Jerry are both unapologetic for their unfaithfulness and express dissatisfaction to their spouses. Terri accidentally reveals her own lesbian romance with Cheri but does not feel guilty for her infidelity. Jerry later confronts Cheri at the art gallery over his wife's affair with her. However, Cheri also shows no remorse or regret for her relationship with Terri or for interfering with Jerry and Terri's troubled marriage. Cheri tells Jerry that Terri can do much better than being with him.

As the film comes to an end, both the married couples split up. Terri moves in with Cheri, although she quickly finds her emotional neediness irritating. Jerry continues his philandering lifestyle with his female theater students. Barry becomes miserable all by himself because he can no longer give himself an erection during masturbation. Mary has moved in with Cary, who treats her coldly like all the other women in his life even though she is pregnant with his child. The film closes with Mary and Cary in bed, as Mary realizes that she is even more unhappy in her new relationship with the catty and heartless Cary than she had been with her clueless husband, Barry.

Cast

Reception

Box office
Your Friends & Neighbors was released on August 21, 1998 in a limited release in 32 theaters grossing $340,288 with an average of $10,634 per theater. The film's widest release was 246 theaters and it ended up grossing $4,714,658, slightly below its $5 million production budget.

Critical response
Your Friends & Neighbors was the first ever film reviewed on Rotten Tomatoes and has an approval rating of 77% based on 57 reviews, with an average rating of 7.02/10. The site's critical consensus states, "Though it may strike some viewers as cold and unpleasant, Neil LaBute's Your Friends & Neighbors is an incisive critique of sexual politics wrapped up in a scathing black comedy." The film has a score of 70 out of 100 on Metacritic based on 27 critics, indicating "generally favorable reviews".

Roger Ebert gave the film four out of four stars. While reviewing the film on At the Movies, while Ebert enjoyed the film, Gene Siskel reviewed the film negatively.

Awards
Jason Patric earned a Sierra Award for Best Supporting Actor from the Las Vegas Film Critics Society Awards. Patric also received a nomination for Best Supporting Actor in a drama from the International Press Academy (Satellite Awards).

References

External links
 
 
 

1998 films
American black comedy films
American comedy-drama films
1998 comedy-drama films
1998 LGBT-related films
1990s English-language films
American LGBT-related films
Lesbian-related films
Films directed by Neil LaBute
1998 independent films
Films produced by Steve Golin
LGBT-related black comedy films
Gramercy Pictures films
PolyGram Filmed Entertainment films
1990s black comedy films
1990s American films
Adultery in films
Films about couples